Melaleuca cheelii is a plant in the myrtle family, Myrtaceae and is endemic to the Wide Bay–Burnett region of Queensland. It has been classified as "near threatened" by the government of Queensland.

Description

The flowers are white to cream-coloured and arranged in spikes at the ends of the branches which continue to grow after flowering. The stamens are arranged in 5 bundles around the flower and each bundle has 8 to 18 stamens. The main flowering season is in September.

Taxonomy and naming
Melaleuca cheelii was first formally described in 1932 by Cyril Tenison White in Proceedings of the Royal Society of Queensland collected by White himself at "Traverston, mouth of the Burrum River, about 180 miles north of Brisbane, Queensland" noting that it was "common in wet places in sandy wallum country". The specific epithet (cheelii) honours Edwin Cheel (1872– 1951) who was a botanist at the state herbarium in Sydney.

Distribution and habitat
This melaleuca occurs in wallum country near Bundaberg including in Burrum Coast National Park and the Meadowvale Nature Park in Bundaberg.

Conservation status
This species has been classified as "near threatened" under the Government of Queensland Nature Conservation (Wildlife) Amendment Regulation (2010).

Use in horticulture
Although not well known in cultivation, a specimen in the Australian National Botanic Gardens in Canberra is more than 20 years old. Others have grown successfully in Adelaide and Brisbane.

References 

cheelii
Myrtales of Australia
Flora of Queensland
Plants described in 1932
Taxa named by Cyril Tenison White